Invisible Hands may refer to:
 "Invisible Hands" (song), a 1983 song by Kim Carnes
 Invisible Hands (novel), by Norwegian author Stig Sæterbakken
 Invisible Hands (EP), a 1997 EP by The Handsome Family
 Invisible Hands Music, an independent record label founded by musician Charles Kennedy

See also 
 Invisible hand (disambiguation)